The 2020 Women's Youth (U-18) World Handball Championship would have been the eighth edition of the championship to be held from 29 September to 11 October 2020 in Croatia under the aegis of International Handball Federation (IHF). It would have been the first time in history that the championship would have been organised by Croatian Handball Federation.

The championship was originally scheduled to be held in China from 18 to 30 August 2020. But on 7 February 2020, the IHF decided to move the tournament to another country due to concerns about the COVID-19 pandemic. Originally scheduled for 18 to 30 August 2020, the tournament was rescheduled to 29 September to 11 October 2020, due to the coronavirus pandemic. On 17 July 2020, the event was postponed.

On 22 February 2021, the tournament was cancelled.

Qualification

New Zealand would have made their debut.

Venues
 Split : Spaladium Arena
 Zagreb : Arena Zagreb
 Varaždin : Varaždin Arena

References

2020
Youth World Handball Championship
International handball competitions hosted by Croatia
Women's handball in Croatia
Handball
Women's Youth World Handball Championship
H